Pseudoneoponera is a ponerine genus of ants found from India to Australia, they are mostly non queen species, most of the species within the genus thrives on only gamergates.

Species

Pseudoneoponera barbata (Stitz, 1911)
Pseudoneoponera bispinosa (Smith, F., 1858)
Pseudoneoponera denticulata (Kirby, 1896)
Pseudoneoponera dubitata (Forel, 1900)
Pseudoneoponera excavata (Emery, 1893)
Pseudoneoponera havilandi (Forel, 1901)
Pseudoneoponera incisa (Emery, 1911)
Pseudoneoponera insularis (Emery, 1889)
Pseudoneoponera mayri (Emery, 1887)
Pseudoneoponera obesa (Emery, 1897)
Pseudoneoponera oculata (Smith, F., 1858)
Pseudoneoponera piliventris (Smith, F., 1858)
Pseudoneoponera porcata (Emery, 1897)
Pseudoneoponera rufipes (Jerdon, 1851)
Pseudoneoponera sandakana (Wheeler, 1919)
Pseudoneoponera sublaevis (Emery, 1887)
Pseudoneoponera tridentata (Smith, F., 1858)
Pseudoneoponera verecundae Donisthorpe, 1943

References

Ponerinae
Ant genera
Hymenoptera of Asia
Hymenoptera of Australia